Statistics of Myanmar National League in the 2009–10 season.

Overview
Yadanarbon FC won the championship.

League standings

References
RSSSF

Myanmar National League seasons
1
1
Myanmar